The Flp/Fap Pilin Putative Holin (FFPP-Hol) Family (TC# 1.E.52) is a large diverse family with members from many bacterial phyla. Some members are annotated as Flp or Fap pilin subunits; others are identified as Holin BlyA family members. They range in size of 50 to 80 amino acyl residues (aas) with a single N-terminal transmembrane segment (TMS) although one member has 99 aas and 2 TMSs (TC# 1.E.52.2.1). Flp homologues are included in TCDB under TC# 3.A.7.13.1 (pXO1-63) and TC# 3.A.7.15.1 (Flp-1). As in March 2016, their precise functions appear to be unknown. A representative list of proteins belonging to the FFPP-Hol family can be found in the Transporter Classification Database.

See also 
 Holin
 Lysin
 Transporter Classification Database

Further reading 
 Reddy, Bhaskara L.; Saier Jr., Milton H. (2013-11-01). "Topological and phylogenetic analyses of bacterial holin families and superfamilies". Biochimica et Biophysica Acta (BBA) - Biomembranes 1828 (11): 2654–2671. . . .
 Saier, Milton H.; Reddy, Bhaskara L. (2015-01-01). "Holins in Bacteria, Eukaryotes, and Archaea: Multifunctional Xenologues with Potential Biotechnological and Biomedical Applications". Journal of Bacteriology 197(1): 7–17. . . . .
 Wang, I. N.; Smith, D. L.; Young, R. (2000-01-01). "Holins: the protein clocks of bacteriophage infections". Annual Review of Microbiology 54: 799–825.. . .
 Young, R.; Bläsi, U. (1995-08-01). "Holins: form and function in bacteriophage lysis". FEMS Microbiology Reviews 17 (1-2): 191–205. . .

References 

Protein families
Membrane proteins
Transmembrane proteins
Transmembrane transporters
Transport proteins
Integral membrane proteins
Holins